F.W.P. Matese was an Italian football club based in Sepicciano, Piedimonte Matese, Caserta, Campania. The club had played in both Prima Categoria Molise and Eccellenza  Molise.

History 
Founded in 2011 as F.W.P. Piedimonte Matese, the club was renamed F.W.P. Matese in 2013. F.W.P. Matese played home fixtures at Stadio Pasqualino Ferrante, a ground shared with neighbours Tre Pini Matese.

Colours and badge

Nearby clubs 
Their closest rivals in terms of distance were A.S.D. Alliphae an Alife-based club and then the more established Caserta-based outfit Casertana. The distance between Alife and Piedimonte Matese is about 3.3 miles (5.5 km), whilst Caserta is approximately 24 miles (40 km) away.

Sponsorship & Kit manufacturer
For the 2015–16 season the club's shirts sponsor was Mec.San. The team's home jersey is manufactured by Italian sports brand Givova. The away jersey is produced by Zeus Sport.

Players

Non-playing staff

Staff

References

External links
 Official Facebook Page
 Official Twitter Page

Football clubs in Campania
Piedimonte Matese
Association football clubs established in 2013
2013 establishments in Italy
Defunct football clubs in Italy